Dini may refer to:

Organizations
National Directorate of Intelligence (Peru), the primary intelligence agency in Peru

Places in Iran 
Ala ol Dini-ye Olya, a village in Eslamabad Rural District, in the Central District of Jiroft County, Kerman Province
Nur ol Dini,a village in Kheyrgu Rural District, Alamarvdasht District, Lamerd County, Fars Province
Tang-e Baha ol Dini, a village in Howmeh Rural District, in the Central District of Larestan County, Fars Province 
Tolombeh-ye Rokn ol Dini, a village in Arzuiyeh Rural District, in the Central District of Arzuiyeh County, Kerman Province
Zeyn ol Dini, a village in Kal Rural District, Eshkanan District, Lamerd County, Fars Province

People 
Abdi Dini (born 1981), professional Canadian wheelchair basketball player
Abdulkadir Sheikh Dini, Somali politician and military officia
Ahmed Dini Ahmed (1932-2004), Djiboutian politician
Andrea Dini (born 1996), Italian football player
Antonio Dini (1918–1940), New Zealand flying ace of the Second World War
Dino Dini, English games developer
Joe Dini (1929-2014), Nevada state assemblyman and casino owner
Lamberto Dini, Italian politician
Lorenzo Dini (born 1994), Italian long-distance runner
Mohamed Dini Farah, Djiboutian politician
Muguette Dini, French politician
Nh. Dini, Indonesian novelist
Nick Dini, American baseball player
Paul Dini, animation and comic writer
Pietro Dini (died 1625), Roman Catholic Archbishop of Fermo
Putu Dini Jasita Utami (born 1994), Indonesian beach volleyball player
Sandra Dini, Italian high jumper
Ulisse Dini, Italian mathematician, after which are named:
 Dini derivative
 Dini test
 Dini's theorem
 Dini criterion
 Dini's surface
 Dini continuity
 Dini–Lipschitz criterion
Umar Said Salim Al Dini,  extrajudicial detention in the United States Guantanamo Bay detention camps, in Cuba
Dini Petty (born 1945), Canadian television and radio host

Other uses 
Dini Ya Msambwa, African traditional religion, labeled as an anti-colonial 
 DinI-like protein family
 Pernikahan Dini, a soap opera that aired on RCTI in 2001

See also
 Dinis (disambiguation)
 Dino (disambiguation)

Italian-language surnames
Surnames of Asian origin
Surnames of Arabic origin
Surnames of African origin